is the 42nd single of the Japanese pop group Every Little Thing, released on July 13, 2011. The single contains two songs: "Sora" and its B-side, "Koe". Both songs are used as the ending theme for the Pokémon movie Victini and the Black Hero: Zekrom and Victini and the White Hero: Reshiram.

Track listing

CD
 
(Words - Kaori Mochida / Music - Kazuhito Kikuchi)
 
(Words - Kaori Mochida / Music - Kazuhito Kikuchi)

DVD

References

2011 singles
2011 songs
Every Little Thing (band) songs
Avex Trax singles
Japanese film songs
Songs written for animated films
Songs from Pokémon